Arroz Con Habichuela (Rice With Bean) is the title of the 2006 studio album by El Gran Combo de Puerto Rico. The Spanish title of the album means "rice with beans" in English which is a popular plate both in Puerto Rico and throughout Latin America. It is also the first album featuring new member, Willie Sotelo, on piano who replaced longtime piano player, Rafael Ithier, so that Ithier could focus more on directing the band. Released by Sony International, the album garnered a radio hit with its first single, "No Hay Manera". The album also received the 2007 Latin Grammy Award for Best Salsa Album.

Track listing 
 "Si la Ves Por Ahí" - 4:36
 "Te Veo Nena" - 4:24
 "No Hay Manera" - 4:31
 "Arroz Con Habichuela" - 5:56
 "Esa Mujer" - 4:33
 "Como Tiembla el Alma" - 4:28
 "Yo No Mendigo Amor" - 4:37
 "Piénsalo" - 4:36
 "No Te Detengas a Pensar" - 4:58
 "Un No Sé Qué" - 4:36

Chart position

Awards and nominations 
Latin Grammy Awards of 2007

2007 Latin Billboard Music Awards

Premios Lo Nuestro 2008

See also
List of number-one Billboard Tropical Albums from the 2000s

References 

2006 albums
El Gran Combo de Puerto Rico albums
Latin Grammy Award for Best Salsa Album